Postepipona is an Afrotropical genus of potter wasps containing two species, one from Madagascar and the other from island of Socotra in Yemen.

References

Biological pest control wasps
Insects of Madagascar
Potter wasps
Fauna of Socotra
Hymenoptera genera